Giorgi "Gega" Diasamidze (born May 8, 1992) is a Georgian footballer who plays as a midfielder for Locomotive Tbilisi.

Career
Gega Diasamidze was invited to train with AGF's reserve team in January 2011. And signed a contract with AGF Aarhus in the spring of 2011, then began to train with the A squad. On 6 March 2012, his contract was annulled.

Another AGF Georgian footballer Davit Devdariani recommended AGF Aarhus to get Davit Skhirtladze and Giorgi Diasamidze.

References

External links 
AGF profile 
Official Danish League stats 

1992 births
Living people
Footballers from Georgia (country)
Association football midfielders
Expatriate footballers from Georgia (country)
Expatriate men's footballers in Denmark
Expatriate footballers in Belarus
Aarhus Gymnastikforening players
FC Sasco players
FC Dila Gori players
FC Dinamo Tbilisi players
FC Lokomotivi Tbilisi players
FC Saburtalo Tbilisi players
Erovnuli Liga players
FC Shakhtyor Soligorsk players